Ince & Elton railway station, on the Hooton–Helsby line, serves both Ince and Elton in Cheshire, England. The station is unstaffed.

History
Ince station was opened on 1 July 1863 by the Birkenhead Joint Railway. It was renamed Ince & Elton on 17 April 1884. Services were operated jointly by the London and North Western Railway and Great Western Railway up until the 1923 Grouping, then by the GWR and the London, Midland and Scottish Railway. After nationalisation in 1948, the station became part of the London Midland region of British Railways.

This station was earmarked for closure, along with Stanlow and Thornton, Helsby and Ellesmere Port, under the proposals made by Dr. Beeching. This was never implemented, although services gradually began to reduce and the remaining through trains to/from Birkenhead Woodside ended in 1967 when the station there was closed.

 
Services originally operated regularly between Helsby and Hooton via Ellesmere Port, with some services running through to Rock Ferry prior to the electrification of the line between there and Hooton in 1985. Once electric trains began running to Hooton, the service was revamped to run between Chester and Helsby via Hooton (with a reversal there) every 30 minutes on weekdays & Saturdays.  Convenient connections were available at Helsby for Warrington & Manchester and at Hooton for Liverpool.  However, following the extension of the third rail southwards to Chester in 1993, the service east of Ellesmere Port was cut back substantially – most trains ran as a shuttle to Ellesmere Port only, with only a two-hourly service beyond there. The pattern was then altered again when electrification of the Hooton to Ellesmere Port section was completed in 1994 – from that point onwards, all services from Helsby terminated at Ellesmere Port but ran beyond Helsby to Warrington Bank Quay and Liverpool Lime Street (every two hours Mon–Sat), calling at all stations en route. The new service was poorly patronised though, and by 1996 it had been cut back to the current pattern of two pairs of services each way in the early morning and mid afternoon.

Some station signs are outdated, displaying information about those former services to Chester and Hooton (see image of sign on Platform 2).

Facilities
 There is level access from the small car park at the front of station onto the Helsby platform. From this platform, to reach the Ellesmere Port platform, turn left, go down the platform end ramp, and providing the level crossing warning lights indicate that it is safe, cross the lines using the foot crossing and then up the platform end ramp.

The road leading down from the main road at Ince to the station is step-free, although there is no pavement. The alternative exit, via the narrow path involves walking up steep steps, which is not accessible for passengers with pushchairs and/or mobility problems.

Northern Trains's Adopt-a-Station scheme is in operation at this station. Members of the local community support the station by carrying out regular duties such as picking up litter and ensuring the station remains in a good overall condition.

Services
 There is a minimal train service (towards Helsby and to Ellesmere Port).

A branch of the Merseyrail electric network Wirral Line terminates at Ellesmere Port, the next but one station to the west after Stanlow and Thornton. Only diesel trains use Ince and Elton station.  The likelihood of electrifying the line and incorporating into the Merseyrail network was low, as there are many dangerous substances and cables surrounding the trackside as the line passes through the Stanlow oil refinery. However, Merseytravel have shown interest in taking ownership of the Halton Curve south of Runcorn to incorporate into the Merseyrail network. This might entail the line being electrified and brought onto the Merseyrail network, giving access to Runcorn, Liverpool South Parkway for John Lennon Airport and maybe onto Liverpool Lime Street. This would give access to Liverpool from both directions. Merseytravel's interest is ongoing and no outcome has been released.

There is no service on Sundays. A normal service operates on most Bank Holidays. In the event of buses replacing trains, only one service in each direction runs, usually in the late afternoon.

In British Rail terminology, this station's rail service(s) would be referred to as a 'Parliamentary train'. This means that the Train Operating Company only runs the minimum number of services required legally, and usually at the least busy times of day, in order to still comply with the law, but to keep operating costs down to an absolute minimum. It is cheaper to run this service than going through a lengthy legal process of applying for station closures.

North Cheshire Rail User Group
A rail user group, the North Cheshire Rail User Group, supports and actively campaigns for an improved service at this station and for this railway line.

Public transport interchange 

At the station exit, there are hourly bus services. The number X2, operated by Stagecoach Merseyside, operates towards Runcorn, or in the opposite direction, towards Ellesmere Port and onward towards Chester. Buses run until around 19:00 local time.

These services only run Monday–Saturday. This means that Ince and Elton villages are not served by any public transport on Sundays.

There is a free small car park located just outside the station. There is no CCTV or staff at this station.

Freight
Freightliner usually run a class 70 'heavy-haul' service to Ellesmere Port twice a day from/to Fiddlers Ferry on Monday to Fridays. On Saturdays there is one scheduled working.

When the Shell oil refinery at Stanlow used the railways to transport freight, over fifteen trains per day used this line. Since then, the sidings and signal box have been removed, and freight is becoming increasingly rare on this line.

No freight trains currently use the station, other than to pass through it.

References

Notes

Sources

Further reading

External links 

Railway stations in Cheshire
DfT Category F2 stations
Former Birkenhead Railway stations
Railway stations in Great Britain opened in 1863
Northern franchise railway stations